Linhomoeidae is a family of nematodes belonging to the order Monhysterida.

Genera

Genera:
 Allgenia
 Anticyathus Cobb, 1920
 Anticyclus Cobb, 1920

References

Nematodes